Weymouth and Melcombe Regis was a borough in England.  It was formed by a charter of Elizabeth I, amalgamating the towns of Weymouth and Melcombe Regis in 1571.

Parliamentary representation 

The towns continued to send the same number of MPs to the unreformed House of Commons as they had before the merger - two for each.  The borough was stripped of its double representation by the Reform Act 1832, which reduced it to two seats, and then was remodelled by the Municipal Reform Act 1835. It ceased to be a parliamentary borough from 1885. Since then, the area covered by the borough has formed part of the South Dorset constituency.

After 1885 

The borough continued in existence, as a municipal borough until 1974, when it was merged, under the Local Government Act 1972, into the district of Weymouth and Portland.

External links
Weymouth & Melcombe Regis Local History

Municipal Borough of
Municipal Borough of
Districts of England abolished by the Local Government Act 1972
Municipal boroughs of England